Petra Schwarz (née Ritter; born 24 May 1972) is a former female professional tennis player from Austria, active from 1987 to 1997.

She reached the quarterfinals of the French Open in 1994, beating Lisa Raymond, Nathalie Tauziat, Miriam Oremans and Ruxandra Dragomir, before losing to Mary Pierce. It was the only time she passed the second round of a Grand Slam event.

Schwarz reached one WTA Tour final at the Ilva Trophy event in Italy. She also reached three doubles finals, winning one of them (Prague, partnering Karin Kschwendt). Her career high ranking was #52 in singles and #60 in doubles.

WTA career finals

Singles: 1 (0–1)

Doubles (1 titles, 2 runner-ups)

ITF finals

Singles (4-3)

Doubles (2–2)

References

External links
 
 
 

1972 births
Living people
Austrian female tennis players
Olympic tennis players of Austria
Tennis players from Vienna
Tennis players at the 1992 Summer Olympics